Two Empire ships were named Empire Curlew:

, a Type C2-S cargo ship in service 1941–42
, a converted LST in service 1956–62

Ship names